Insurgency: Modern Infantry Combat is a total conversion mod for Valve's Source engine. Released in 2007, it's a multiplayer tactical shooter, focused on a realistic experience, compared to other titles in that period. The game is primarily set in Iraq and Afghanistan, in a war between the United States Marine Corps, and a group of rebel insurgents.

Thanks to the success of Insurgency: Modern Infantry Combat, the developers founded the company New World Interactive in 2010; a standalone sequel, titled Insurgency, was then released in 2014.

Gameplay
The game is primarily a team-based, multiplayer online shooter focused on tactical, objective-based gameplay. The player can join one of two faction: the United States Marine Corps, or the Insurgents, a group of rebels inspired by the Taliban. The factions are split into smaller squads, led by a squad leader, who can request their members to attack, defend, move into, or secure points on the map.

Each squad contains multiple classes to choose from, limited in number (such as Rifleman, Support Gunner, Engineer or Marksman); each class sports a different variety of weapons and equipment. The game has a pseudo-realistic portrayal of the weaponry used. There is no on-screen crosshair and the players must use the iron sights of the game's weapon model to accurately aim the weapon. Shooting "from the hip" is still possible; however, the free-aim system makes this difficult. Weapons are also more deadly than in most first-person shooter titles, as most rifles are capable of taking out players with one or two shots to the torso, and attempt to imitate real-life ballistics. According to their class, players can also use fragmentation grenades, smoke grenades, and RPGs.

Insurgency: Modern Infantry Combat doesn't feature a typical respawn system. Instead, the game makes use of a reinforcement wave system: all eliminated players respawn together, at the end of a preset timer. Waves are limited in number, therefore if a faction remains with no waves, and all surviving players are eliminated, it's an automatic loss, and victory is given to the opponent.

Development history
The development of Operation: Counter-Insurgency (OPCOIN) started in 2002, when Andrew Spearin decided to create a realistic modern infantry squad-based multiplayer first-person shooter, based on his experiences in the Canadian Army.

Jeremy Blum, founder of the Red Orchestra mod, joined the team in 2005, along with other former Red Orchestra developers. Blum renamed the project into simply Insurgency (later known as Insurgency: Modern Infantry Combat); full production started and continued until the first public release in 2007. Various updates were released in the following years, introducing new content and improvements to the game.

Sequels 
In 2012, developers at New World Interactive announced they had been working on a successor, titled Insurgency 2, and the creation of a website for the Insurgency franchise.

The game was renamed Insurgency, and was published on Steam as early access in March 2013. 10 months later, the game officially released on the 22nd of January, 2014.

In February 2016, New World Interactive announced a sequel, Insurgency: Sandstorm. The game is available for Microsoft Windows, and for the PlayStation 4, Xbox One, PlayStation 5, and Xbox Series X/S. Insurgency: Sandstorm is published by Focus Home Interactive and uses Unreal Engine 4. Originally planned to be released in 2017, the Microsoft Windows version of the game was released on December 12, 2018, on Steam to critical acclaim from game critics and players alike. The console versions were released on September 29, 2021 for said consoles.

References

External links
 

2007 video games
Fangames
First-person shooters
Iraq War video games
Iraq War in fiction
Linux games
Multiplayer online games
MacOS games
Source (game engine) mods
War in Afghanistan (2001–2021) video games
Video games about the United States Marine Corps
Video games set in Afghanistan
Video games set in Iraq
Windows games